The Port of Galați is the largest port and sea port on the Danube River and the second largest Romanian port. Located in the city of Galaţi, the port is an important source of revenue for the city because many large international companies have established there.

The shipbuilding industry is a key activity of the port and Dutch company Damen Group, which owns the Galați shipyard, is the most important enterprise established there.

The port is used by the Mittal Steel Company as its transport hub for exporting and importing cargo from and for Mittal Steel Galaţi, the largest Romanian steel producer.

References

External links

  Port of Galati - useful data and shipping directory

Ports and harbours of Romania
Galați